Atal Pedestrian Bridge is a pedestrian triangular truss bridge at Sabarmati Riverfront on Sabarmati river in Ahmedabad, Gujarat, India. It has a design inspired by kites.

History

The Ahmedabad Municipal Corporation named it after former Indian Prime Minister Atal Bihari Vajpayee on his birth anniversary on 25 December 2021. The construction was completed by June 2022. On 27 August 2022, it was inaugurated by Prime Minister Narendra Modi.

Architecture

The bridge is located between Sardar Bridge and Ellis Bridge. It is designed by STUP Consultants Ltd based in Mumbai and built by P&R Infraprojects Ltd.

The design is inspired by kite festival organised in the city.

It is a single span steel truss bridge with two additional foundations. The cross section of the truss has rhombus shape similar to kites. The elevation of the truss gives impression of an arch which is supported on spherical bearings on each end. The depth of the truss varies across the length. The bridge is shaded by colourful fabric panels with colours inspired by kites. They protect people from harsh climate. 2600 metric tonnes of steel pipes were used in its construction. The railings are made of steel and glass. It is lit by LED lights.

It features two levels of walkways at each end connecting upper and lower promenades of the Sabarmati riverfront. It connects the flower garden on the west bank to upcoming arts and culture centre on the east bank.

See also
 Amgen Helix Pedestrian Bridge
 Bridge of Peace
 Peace Bridge
 Sudama Setu
 Tabiat Bridge
 Okha–Beyt Dwarka Signature Bridge

References

Ahmedabad
Pedestrian bridges in India
Bridges in Gujarat
Steel bridges
Bridges completed in 2022
2022 establishments in Gujarat
Truss bridges
Memorials to Atal Bihari Vajpayee